The following is the list of players who have debuted either in the Australian Football League (AFL) or for a new club during the 2015 AFL season.

Summary

AFL debuts

Change of AFL club

References
Full listing of players who made their AFL or club debut in 2015

Australian rules football records and statistics
Australian rules football-related lists
Debut